Rugby Central was a railway station serving Rugby in Warwickshire on the former Great Central Main Line, which opened in 1899 and closed in 1969. The station was on Hillmorton Road, roughly half a mile east of the town centre.

The Great Central competed with the West Coast Main Line for traffic to London, which has served the town since the 1830s at Rugby Midland station; since the closure of Rugby Central, Midland station has reverted to its original name of Rugby.

History
The station was opened on 15 March 1899.

The station was run by the Great Central Railway from 1899 until it was grouped into the London and North Eastern Railway in 1923. It came under the management of British Railways in 1948.

Rugby Central was roughly midway along the Great Central Main Line (GCML) and was a stopping point for express services, as well as a changeover point for local services. The line was then downgraded, with express services being removed, leaving only the local services and an infrequent semi-fast service to London.

Most of the GCML was closed on 5 September 1966, following the recommendations of the Reshaping of British Railways report. On that date, the line south of Rugby Central and north of Nottingham Victoria was closed. Until 3 May 1969, the section between Rugby Central and Nottingham (initially Nottingham Victoria, later cut back to ) remained open as self-contained branch, providing DMU-operated local passenger services. The station formally closed on 5 May.

Station masters

Mr. Deane
Frederick White Fox 1903 - 1927 (afterwards station master at Mansfield)
J.W. Plant 1927 - 1929 (afterwards station master at Worksop)
G.A. Smith 1929 - 1934 (formerly station master at Kirton Lindsey)
Hubert George Currell 1934 - 1948 (formerly station master at St Albans London Road)
James Ernest Potts 1948 - 1963
Ivor Jones 1963 - 1966

Design
The booking office was at street level, built onto the side of the road bridge over the railway with the platform below. The platform was accessed by a covered staircase from the booking office. On the platform were three waiting rooms and a toilet block, which was the only building not covered by the canopy.

On the heritage Great Central Railway in Leicestershire, the preserved  station is a similar design to the former Rugby Central.

Remains

The station buildings were demolished after closure, but the platform still exists and is open to the public: The station site, and 4.5 miles of the former Great Central Railway trackbed through Rugby, are now owned by Rugby Borough Council, who bought them in 1970 for £5,500. The trackbed runs mostly through cuttings, and it is now used as a footpath, cycleway and nature reserve called the Great Central Walk.

The former goods yard was west of the station and was used as a timber yard until the mid-1990s, when houses were built on it.

Reopening proposals
The proposal is a "secondary aspiration" of Chiltern's franchise agreement. However, Chiltern stated in 2013 that the plan is "no longer active". In recent years, proposals to reopen the railway line as an alternative route to HS2 have been proposed, and in 2015, opponents of HS2 called for the GCR to be reopened as an alternative.
In October 2017, English Regional Transport Association proposed reopening the line from Calvert to Rugby with a new link to Nuneaton as part of a West Coast relief line.

Notes

References

External links

London to Warwickshire railways - Includes old photographs of Rugby Central.
Rugby Central railway station on Subterranea Britannica.

Disused railway stations in Warwickshire
Former Great Central Railway stations
Railway stations in Great Britain opened in 1899
Railway stations in Great Britain closed in 1969
Beeching closures in England
1899 establishments in England
1969 disestablishments in England
Rugby, Warwickshire